The Fossil Fuel Levy (FFL) is a levy paid by suppliers of electricity from non-renewable energy sources in the United Kingdom. The costs are shared by the suppliers and consumers, as a proportion of the cost is passed on to consumers in the cost of the electricity supplied. The Fossil Fuel Levy was imposed to fund the Non-Fossil Fuel Obligation.

Legislation
In England and Wales the Fossil Fuel Levy was introduced under the Electricity Act 1989. Section 33 of this Act was briefly superseded by the Fossil Fuel Levy Act 1998 until its repeal (by the Utilities Act 2000), bringing the FFL back under the Electricity Act.

In Scotland, the Fossil Fuel Levy was not imposed until 1996, as support for the nuclear industry in Scotland (the original purpose of the Levy in England and Wales) was provided by the 1990 Scottish 'Nuclear Energy Agreement'.

Rates
The Levy has been applied at various rates, but in recent years has been set at zero as the Climate Change Levy was introduced. Rates are controlled by Ofgem.

See also
Climate Change Levy
Renewables Obligation Certificates
Energy policy of the United Kingdom
Energy use and conservation in the United Kingdom

External links
 Fossil Fuel Levy Act 1998
The Fossil Fuel Levy (Amendment) (No. 2) Regulations 2001
The Fossil Fuel Levy (Scotland) Amendment Regulations 2005

Fossil fuels in the United Kingdom